The 1864 United States presidential election in Michigan took place on November 8, 1864, as part of the 1864 United States presidential election. Voters chose eight representatives, or electors, to the Electoral College, who voted for president and vice president.

Michigan was won by incumbent president Abraham Lincoln over Democratic challenger George B. McClellan by a margin of 7.2%.

, this is the last time Ottawa County voted for a Democratic Presidential candidate.

Results

See also
 United States presidential elections in Michigan

References

Michigan
1864
1864 Michigan elections